Suavodrillia is a genus of sea snails, marine gastropod mollusks in the family Borsoniidae.

Species
Species within the genus Suavodrillia include:
 Suavodrillia declivis (Martens, 1880)
 Suavodrillia kennicotti (Dall, 1871)
 Suavodrillia textilia Dall, 1927
 Species brought into synonymy
 Suavodrillia (Typhlomangelia) G.O. Sars, 1878 : synonym of Typhlomangelia G.O. Sars, 1878
 † Suavodrillia bicarinata Ozaki, 1958: synonym of † Abyssotrophon crystallinus (Kuroda, 1953)
 Suavodrillia sagamiana Dall, 1925: synonym of Bathytoma engonia (Watson, 1881)
 Suavodrillia tanneri (Verrill & Smith, 1884): synonym of Drilliola pruina, synonym of Retidrillia pruina (Watson, 1881) 
 Suavodrillia willetti Dall, 1919: synonym of Retidrillia willetti (Dall, 1919)

References

External links
  Bouchet P., Kantor Yu.I., Sysoev A. & Puillandre N. (2011) A new operational classification of the Conoidea. Journal of Molluscan Studies 77: 273-308.
 

 
Gastropod genera